Roxanne Dora Petrucci (born March 17, 1962 in Rochester, Michigan) is an American drummer best known for her work with the heavy metal bands Madam X and Vixen.

Biography
Petrucci and her sister, Maxine Petrucci, first formed Madam X with vocalist Bret Kaiser and Chris Doliber. She left Madam X to join Vixen in 1986 and stayed until 1991. Roxy returned when Vixen reunited in 1997, bringing in her sister Maxine into the fold, but the lineup had to be dissolved the next year for legal reasons. She later rejoined a Jan Kuehnemund-led Vixen, but the reunion ended in 2001. In 2004, VH1 approached the four members of the "classic lineup" to appear on their show, Bands Reunited. The show was recorded in August 2004, and broadcast in the U.S. in November 2004. Following the broadcast of the VH1 show, EMI's American label Capitol re-released the first two Vixen albums, Vixen and Rev It Up.

In 2012, Janet Gardner, Share Pedersen, and Petrucci announced they and Gina Stile would form their own band. Thus, they became known as JanetShareRoxyGina (or JSRG for short). JSRG began playing shows at the end of 2012, followed by touring on the Monsters of Rock cruise in March 2013, and performing at the tenth anniversary of the melodic rock festival Firefest in the UK later in October. In December, JSRG evolved into Vixen to honor Kuehnemund's posthumous legacy. Petrucci also played for Roktopuss with former Femme Fatale vocalist and future Vixen bandmate Lorraine Lewis, who succeeded Gardner on vocals in January 2019 after the latter stepped down.

Bands
 Madam X (1984–1986, 1991, 2014–current)
 Vixen (1986–1991, 1997–1998, 2001, 2004, 2013–current)
 Roktopuss (2006–2013)
 JSRG (2012–2013)

Discography

Madam X 
We Reserve the Right (1984)
Monstrocity (2017)

Vixen 
Vixen (1988)
Rev It Up (1990)
Tangerine (1998)
The Best of Vixen: Full Throttle (1999)
Live Fire (2018)

Maxine Petrucci 
Titania (2006)

Docker's Guild 
The Heisenberg Diaries - Book A: Sounds of Future Past (2016)

Videos

Vixen
Revved Up (1990)
MTV Unplugged (1990)
 played "Edge of a Broken Heart" and "Love Is a Killer"

References

External links
Roxy Petrucci's official site

1962 births
Living people
American women drummers
American heavy metal drummers
American heavy metal singers
American women heavy metal singers
American people of Italian descent
Glam metal musicians
Musicians from Michigan
People from Rochester, Michigan
American women songwriters
American rock drummers
American rock songwriters
Post-grunge musicians
Songwriters from Michigan
Madam X (band) members
Vixen (band) members
20th-century American drummers
21st-century American drummers
20th-century American women musicians
21st-century American women musicians